Miriam Vale is a rural town and locality in the Gladstone Region, Queensland, Australia.

Geography

Economy
Miriam Vale is renowned as a traditional cattle growing area, and also supports timber, beef and dairy cattle. Tourism is an emerging industry within the shire and the town is a gateway to the tourist resorts of Agnes Water and the Town of 1770.

In the 1970s signs at the entry to town proudly proclaimed "Welcome to Miriam Vale – Cattle, Tobacco, Timber and Dairy". The tobacco industry faded in the late 1970s followed by the dairy industry in the 1990s.

History

Gureng Gureng (also known as Gooreng Gooreng, Goreng Goreng, Goeng, Gurang, Goorang Goorang, Korenggoreng) is an Australian Aboriginal language spoken by the Gureng Gureng people. The Gooreng Gooreng language region includes the towns of Bundaberg, Gin Gin and Miriam Vale extending south towards Childers, inland to Monto and Mt Perry.

Miriam Vale Post Office opened on 1 April 1877.

Miriam Vale Provisional School opened in March 1897 and became Miram Vale State School on 14 July 1897.

St Mary's Anglican Church was opened on Sunday 18 February 1912 by Bishop George Halford. It was a timber church. It was replaced by a new church built circa 1975.

Miriam Vale War Memorial was unveiled on 14 December 1921 by John William Fletcher, the Member of the Queensland Legislative Assembly for Port Curtis.

St Peter Chanel Catholic Church was opened in September 1954 by Bishop Andrew Gerard Tynan. It was a timber church.

Timber industry
The timber industry has roots in the late 19th century, with early timber cutters working along the Bobby Range cutting hoop pine. In these early days hoop pine was cut and two timer chutes allowed logs to be shot to the foot of the range where bullock wagons were waiting. Evidence of these old chutes can still be found at the back of Boreelum on the sides of the range. The southern chute was on tram rails and consisted of two carriages. As the log was lowered down the mountain the other empty carriage was drawn to the top. This was achieved by a small overtaking siding in the middle. The other chute to the west was smaller and built out of logs. The timber was in most cases ferried to rail at Lowmead.

There were also many timber mills in the district but many of these closed in the late part of the century. Perhaps the closest mill to town was located on the flat at House Creek.

Dairy industry 
The dairy industry has the most claim to fame with a massive fig tree near the railway station being the drop off point of "cream cans" full of milk. This depot (being no more than a wooden stage) was the district dairy focal point. Locals would deliver the fresh milk to the depot where it was then loaded onto Claude's Truck for the trip to the Port Curtis Dairy (PCD). Fresh milk wasn't always the delivery and in the 1950s cream was separated on farms and delivered to town. Cream in those days was sold on "degrees of Rancid" (fresh, ripe, stale) as there was no refrigeration. The cream even then was going to the PCD in Gladstone.

Racing 

A car rally passed through Miriam Vale in 1924; the stretch of road between Miriam Vale and Gin Gin was said to the roughest of the rally.

Across House Creek there is also evidence of an old speed way ground (circa 1970s). There are some old horse race tracks in the area.

Population 
In the 2006 census, Miriam Vale had a population of 361 people.

In the 2011 census, Miriam Vale had a population of 422 people.

Heritage listings 
Miriam Vale has a number of heritage-listed sites, including
 Miriam Vale War Memorial, Blomfield Street
 Big Fig, Station Street (

Education 

Miriam Vale State School is a government primary and secondary (Prep-10) school for boys and girls at 15 Roe Street. In 2017, the school had an enrolment of 135 students with 17 teachers (14 full-time equivalent) and 12 non-teaching staff (8 full-time equivalent). In 2018, the school had an enrolment of 129 students with 17 teachers (14 full-time equivalent) and 11 non-teaching staff (8 full-time equivalent). 

For secondary schooling beyond Year 10, students go to Tannum Sands State High School in Tannum Sands to the north.

Amenities

The Miriam Vale Library is at 41 Blomfield Street; it is operated by the Gladstone Regional Council.

There is a Gladstone Regional Council administration centre at 36 Roe Street.

The Miriam Vale branch of the Queensland Country Women's Association meets at the QCWA Hall at Blomfield Street.

St Peter Chanel Catholic Church is at 40 Bruce Highway.

St Mary's Anglican Church is at 10 Larson Street. It is part of the parish of Boyne River within the Anglican Church of Central Queensland.

Attractions 
Miriam Vale has a nine-hole golf course with small greens and mature gum trees. At times in its history the course was stretched to twelve holes but the members and district could not sustain the extra work needed to keep these holes open. Miriam vale is the gateway to the Coral Coast of Agnes Waters and 1770. The Main street of Miriam Vale, is home to the historical Miriam Vale Cafe. The main street boasts a child and dog friendly park.

Transport 
Miram Vale is on the North Coast railway line and is serviced by the Miriam Vale railway station.

References

Further reading

External links

 
 

Towns in Queensland
Gladstone Region
Localities in Queensland